The Arve Valley (La vallée de l'Arve) is an alpine valley located in the French Haute-Savoie department. The namesake of the valley is the river at the bottom: the Arve. The valley as a whole makes up the majority of Faucigny, one of the Natural Regions of France, and one of six that make up the Savoie region.

Geography 
The Arve Valley consists of the upper reaches of the river Arve, whose source is in the Mont Blanc massif, on the Savoyard Col-du-Balme side. Down stream, the river passes through the plain of Annemassy, before emptying into the Rhône in the Swiss canton of Geneva.

The Valley came into being during the last ice age when the Alpine glaciers extended beyond Geneva.

There is controversy over the true extent of the upper valley. The broadest definition makes the start upstream of Sallanches, including Passy and the valleys of Mégève, Montjoie, and Chamonix. This also describes the region of "Mont Blanc country" (Pays du Mont Blanc.) 

Some consider the upper valley to only include the valley of Chamonix. This valley stretches, from downstream, through the communes of Servoz, Les Houches, Chamonix-Mont-Blanc and Vallorcine.

History 
Historically, the valley was a part of Farcigny, which was ceded to the Count of Savoie during the reign of Amadeus VI in 1355.

Urbanisation 
The bottom of the valley is heavily urbanised including the cities/towns of:

 Chamonix (including Les Houches, Servoz, Les Bossons, Argenitière...)
 Sallanches, Passy and Saint-Gervais-les-Bains
 Cluses
 Scionzier
 Bonneville

References

Geneva
Haute-Savoie
Mont Blanc massif